Fulvio Scola (born 10 December 1982) is an Italian cross-country skier who has competed since 2001. His best finish at the FIS Nordic World Ski Championships was eighth in the individual sprint event at Liberec in 2009.

Scola's best World Cup finish was 12th in the 15 km event in Otepää, Estonia in 2007. He has two career victories in the Alpen Cup, both in sprint events with one in 2008 and one in 2009.

Cross-country skiing results
All results are sourced from the International Ski Federation (FIS).

World Championships

World Cup

Season standings

Individual podiums
1 podium – (1 )

Team podiums
 1 podium – (1 )

References

External links

1982 births
Italian male cross-country skiers
Universiade medalists in cross-country skiing
Living people
Universiade bronze medalists for Italy
Cross-country skiers at the 2007 Winter Universiade